Tull is a town in Grant County, Arkansas, United States. The population was 448 at the 2010 census, up from 358 in 2000. It is part of the Central Arkansas region.

Geography
Tull is located in northwestern Grant County at  (34.446405, -92.581518). It is bordered to the north and northwest by the Saline County line. The northwest border of the town follows the Saline River, a south-flowing tributary of the Ouachita River.

Demographics

As of the census of 2000, there were 358 people, 155 households, and 110 families residing in the town.  The population density was 40.4/km (104.6/mi2).  There were 167 housing units at an average density of 18.9/km (48.8/mi2).  The racial makeup of the town was 99.16% White, 0.56% Native American, and 0.28% from two or more races.  3.07% of the population were Hispanic or Latino of any race.

There were 155 households, out of which 26.5% had children under the age of 18 living with them, 64.5% were married couples living together, 3.9% had a female householder with no husband present, and 29.0% were non-families. 27.1% of all households were made up of individuals, and 20.0% had someone living alone who was 65 years of age or older.  The average household size was 2.31 and the average family size was 2.81.

In the town, the population was spread out, with 19.0% under the age of 18, 7.8% from 18 to 24, 27.9% from 25 to 44, 29.1% from 45 to 64, and 16.2% who were 65 years of age or older.  The median age was 43 years. For every 100 females, there were 101.1 males.  For every 100 females age 18 and over, there were 93.3 males.

The median income for a household in the town was $33,750, and the median income for a family was $41,406. Males had a median income of $30,417 versus $29,250 for females. The per capita income for the town was $18,017.  About 10.1% of families and 10.7% of the population were below the poverty line, including 14.1% of those under age 18 and 7.8% of those age 65 or over.

Education
Tull is in the Bauxite School District, and is zoned to Bauxite High School.

References

Towns in Grant County, Arkansas
Towns in Arkansas
Little Rock–North Little Rock–Conway metropolitan area